Louise Marie-Thérèse, also known as The Black Nun of Moret (c. 1658 – 1730), was a French nun and the subject of accounts from the 18th century in which she  was dubiously claimed to be the daughter of the Queen of France, Maria Theresa of Spain. Her existence is mentioned in several different sources.

History
The Black Nun of Moret, Louise Marie-Thérèse (1664–1732), was a Benedictine nun in the abbey of Moret-sur-Loing. She was called the "Mauresse de Moret" ("Mooress of Moret"), and a portrait of her exists in the Bibliothèque Sainte Geneviève in Paris. Research conducted by the Société de l'histoire de Paris et d'Ile-de-France, published in 1924 by Honoré Champion éditions, concluded that this pastel portrait was painted around 1680 by the same hand which painted the series of 22 pastel portraits of Kings of France, from Louis IX to Louis XIV, between 1681 and 1683 on the initiative of Father Claude Du Molinet (1620–1687), librarian of Sainte Geneviève abbey.

Mentions
Several writers from the time have devoted paragraphs to her: she is mentioned in the memoirs of Madame de Maintenon, the Grande Mademoiselle, Madame de Montespan, Duke of Saint-Simon, Voltaire, Cardinal Dubois, and in the Journal of the Duc de Luynes.

Royal connections
Shortly after the death of the French Queen Maria Theresa of Spain, wife of Louis XIV, in 1683, courtiers said that this woman could be the daughter, allegedly black, to whom the Queen gave birth in 1664. The nun herself seemed convinced of her royal birth, and Saint-Simon states that she once greeted the Dauphin as "my brother". A letter sent on 13 June 1685, by the Secretary of the King's Household to M. De Bezons, general agent of the clergy, and the pension of 300 pounds granted by King Louis XIV to the nun Louise Marie-Thérèse on 15 October 1695, "to be paid to her all her life in this convent or everywhere she could be, by the guards of the Royal treasure present and to come" suggest that she may, indeed, have had royal connections. The duc de Luynes claimed that she was the daughter of two black gardeners, too poor to educate her, who applied to Mme. de Maintenon for patronage.

Death
She died at Moret-sur-Loing.

In popular culture
In 1978, French writer Pierre-Marie Dijol published the book Nabo, ou le Masque de Fer, in which he claimed that the nun's father was Nabo, Queen Maria Theresa's dwarf black page, who was removed from court by order of the king soon after Louise Marie-Thérèse's birth, and incarcerated as the Man in the Iron Mask, under the pseudonym of "Eustache Dauger".

The circumstances surrounding Louise Marie-Thérèse's birth are portrayed in the first three episodes of the TV drama series Versailles, which premiered in France on 16 November 2015. In the programme she is the illegitimate daughter of Queen Maria Theresa and Prince Annaba from Assinia. Nobu the dwarf was blamed and was later found dead in the fountain in front of the palace, implying he was the father and either killed to keep the secret or out of Louis' vengeance for cuckolding him under his own roof.  Later the child was used as a bargaining chip to gain trade routes in Assinia, and was taken by the Prince (now King) to Assinia.

References

External links
 Dates and information

18th-century French nuns
House of Bourbon (France)
1658 births
1730 deaths
17th-century French nuns